Landsforrådt as an adverb in the Norwegian language: 

"Landsforrådt" is a relatively new term in the Norwegian language. It means "to be betrayed by your country of origin." Examples of "landsforrådt" are: 
 A person who is denied their legal rights by their government.
 A person whose existence is not acknowledged by their country of origin.
 A person who is denied entry to or in exile from their country of origin without proper justification and/or notification.
 A person who is deprived by their government, of their identity (and or merits). A person whose property, rights or own physical body is not protected by the law of the land, when exposed to danger or injustice.

One or more of these criteria qualifies as a violation of the United Nations Universal Declaration of Human Rights.

References

Norwegian words and phrases